Blinds or window blinds are a window covering composed of long strips of fabric or rigid material.

Blinds may also refer to:

 Blinds (poker), forced bets posted by players in poker
 Blinds.com, an e-commerce retailer of window coverings
 WindowBlinds, a computer program that allows users to skin the Windows graphical user interface

See also
 Blind (disambiguation)